Lock Five is an unincorporated community in Hale County, Alabama. The Lock 5 Park and Recreation Area, which is maintained by the United States Army Corps of Engineers, is listed as one of the stops on the Alabama Birding Trails.

References

Unincorporated communities in Hale County, Alabama
Unincorporated communities in Alabama